Oxalis caerulea, the blue woodsorrel, is a perennial plant and herb in the family Oxalidaceae. It is native to the southwestern United States.

A similar species is the tenleaf pink-sorrel (Oxalis decaphylla).

References

caerulea
Flora of Arizona